Frederick James Britton (August 16, 1932 – September 12, 2014) was a Canadian curler. He played as second on the Lyall Dagg rink that won the 1964 Brier and World Championship. He died in 2014.

Personal life
At the time of the 1964 Worlds, Hebert worked for Canadian Bechtel Ltd.. In addition to curling, his background included ice hockey and softball.

References

External links

 Frederick Britton – Curling Canada Stats Archive

1932 births
2014 deaths
Brier champions
World curling champions
Canadian male curlers
Curlers from Manitoba
People from Winnipeg Capital Region
20th-century Canadian people